Kuan Chia-hsien (born June 7, 1985) is a Taiwanese former swimmer, who specialized in backstroke events. Kuan competed in a backstroke double, as a 15-year-old, at the 2000 Summer Olympics in Sydney. She achieved FINA B-standards of 1:05.54 (100 m backstroke) and 2:21.12 (200 m backstroke) from the National University Games in Taipei. On the second day of the Games, Kuan placed fortieth in the 100 m backstroke. Swimming in heat two, she trailed behind the rest of the field over the race, and picked up a seventh seed in 1:07.18, more than 1.2 seconds below her entry standard. Four days later, in the 200 m backstroke, Kuan edged out Croatia's Petra Banović on the final stretch to post a third-seeded time of 2:24.61 from heat one, but finished only in thirty-third overall on the morning prelims.

References

1985 births
Living people
Taiwanese female backstroke swimmers
Olympic swimmers of Taiwan
Swimmers at the 2000 Summer Olympics
Female backstroke swimmers
Sportspeople from Taipei
Asian Games medalists in swimming
Asian Games bronze medalists for Chinese Taipei
Medalists at the 1998 Asian Games
Swimmers at the 1998 Asian Games